Fabrizio Vidale (born 2 February 1970) is an Italian actor and voice actor.

Biography 
Vidale is the son of historic voice actor Franco Latini and actress Piera Vidale. He is also the half-brother of Latini's two daughters Laura and Ilaria Latini, who are also voice actresses. Vidale is the official Italian voice of Jack Black. He also dubbed Marlon Wayans, Martin Lawrence, Will Smith and Chris Rock in some of their films. He is known for voicing Bilbo Baggins in the Italian version of The Hobbit film franchise as well as War Machine in the Italian dubbed versions of the Marvel Cinematic Universe films.

In Vidale's animated film roles, he was the Italian voice of Piglet in the Winnie the Pooh franchise from 1989 until 2003 when he was replaced by Luca Dal Fabbro. Other Italian dubbing roles included King Candy in Wreck-It Ralph, Maui in Moana and B.O.B in Monsters vs. Aliens.

Personal life 
Vidale has two daughters who are also voice actresses. His father Franco Latini died of a stroke on his 21st birthday.

Filmography

Cinema
 Io zombo, tu zombi, lei zomba (1979)
 L'estate sta finendo (1987)
 Ultrà (1991)
 Donne con le gonne (1991)
 Un cane sciolto (1991)
 Fuochi d'artificio (1997)
 Naja (1997)
 Il decisionista (1997)
 Lucky and Zorba (1998) - Voice 
 The Good Pope: Pope John XXIII (2003)

Dubbing roles

Animation
Piglet in Winnie the Pooh (1989-2003)
Speedy Gonzales in Looney Tunes (1996-2006)
Jacques von Hämsterviel in Stitch! The Movie
Jacques von Hämsterviel in Leroy & Stitch
Jacques von Hämsterviel in Lilo & Stitch: The Series
Maui in Moana
Gunter in Sing
Tip in The Little Mermaid II: Return to the Sea
King Candy in Wreck-It Ralph
Scrooge McDuck in DuckTales
Pedro in Rio
Pedro in Rio 2
Barry B. Benson in Bee Movie
Cubert Farnsworth in Futurama
Mr. Weenie in Open Season
Mr. Weenie in Open Season 2
Mr. Weenie in Open Season 3
B.O.B in Monsters vs. Aliens
B.O.B in Monsters vs Aliens: The Series
Pepé the King Prawn in It's a Very Merry Muppet Christmas Movie
Dipsy (1st voice) in Teletubbies 
Nelson Muntz (2nd voice) / Carl Carlson (1st voice) in The Simpsons
Young Copper in The Fox and the Hound
Ghost of Christmas Past in A Christmas Carol
Fife in Beauty and the Beast: The Enchanted Christmas
Detective Bill Stork in Hoodwinked!
Dr. Schadenfreude's Igor in Igor
Hackus in The Smurfs 2
Owen in Total Drama
Curley in Soul
Kyle Broflovski (1st voice) in South Park
Flynn in Ice Age: Continental Drift
Ross in The Angry Birds Movie
Paris in Gnomeo & Juliet
Uncle Ubb in The Lorax
Sergei in The Secret Life of Pets 2
Ducky in Toy Story 4
Félix Madrigal in Encanto
Biclops in ChalkZone

Live action
Barry Judd in High Fidelity
Dewey Finn in School of Rock
Carl Denham in King Kong
Ignacio in Nacho Libre
Miles Dumont in The Holiday
Malcolm in Margot at the Wedding
Jerry McLean in Be Kind Rewind
Jeff Portnoy in Tropic Thunder
Zed in Year One
Lemuel Gulliver in Gulliver's Travels
Jack Black in The Muppets
Bernie Tiede in Bernie
Daniel Gregory Landsman in The D Train
R. L. Stine / Slappy the Dummy in Goosebumps
R.L. Stine in Goosebumps 2: Haunted Halloween
Sheldon Oberon in Jumanji: Welcome to the Jungle
Sheldon Oberon in Jumanji: The Next Level
Jonathan Barnavelt in The House with a Clock in Its Walls
Bilbo Baggins in The Hobbit: An Unexpected Journey
Bilbo Baggins in The Hobbit: The Desolation of Smaug
Bilbo Baggins in The Hobbit: The Battle of the Five Armies
James Rhodes in Iron Man
James Rhodes in Iron Man 2
James Rhodes in Iron Man 3
James Rhodes in Avengers: Age of Ultron
James Rhodes in Captain America: Civil War
James Rhodes in Avengers: Infinity War
James Rhodes in Captain Marvel
Bagger Vance in The Legend of Bagger Vance
Shorty Meeks in Scary Movie
Shorty Meeks in Scary Movie 2
Calvin Simms in Little Man
Gawain MacSam in The Ladykillers
Marcus Copeland in White Chicks
Wallace A. Weems in G.I. Joe: The Rise of Cobra
Jack Twist in Brokeback Mountain
Marion Moseby in The Suite Life of Zack & Cody
Marion Moseby in The Suite Life on Deck
Marion Moseby in The Suite Life Movie
Black Doug in The Hangover
Black Doug in The Hangover Part III
Bald-Headed Man in Lemony Snicket's A Series of Unfortunate Events
Steven Jacobs in Rise of the Planet of the Apes

References

External links 

 
 
 

1970 births
Living people
Male actors from Rome
Italian male voice actors
Italian male film actors
Italian male child actors
Italian radio presenters
20th-century Italian male actors
21st-century Italian male actors